Cleaves is a surname. Notable people with the surname include:

Henry B. Cleaves
Jessica Cleaves (1948–2014), American singer-songwriter
Margaret Cleaves (1848–1917), American physician
Mateen Cleaves (born 1977), American basketball player

See also
Cleave (disambiguation)